Henry J. "Harry" Weber (March 1862 - December 22, 1926) was an American Major League Baseball catcher who played in  with the Indianapolis Hoosiers.

Weber played in 3 games, going hitless in 8 at-bats.

External links

Major League Baseball catchers
Baseball players from New York (state)
Indianapolis Hoosiers (AA) players
1862 births
1926 deaths
Muskegon (minor league baseball) players
19th-century baseball players
Burials at Crown Hill Cemetery